The 2014 FIVB Volleyball World League was the 25th edition of the annual men's international volleyball tournament, played by 28 countries from 23 May to 20 July 2014. The Group 1 Final Round was held in Florence, Italy.

Qualification
No qualification tournament.
All teams of the 2013 edition directly qualified.
10 teams were invited by the FIVB.

Format
It will be the first time the World League will feature 28 teams, having had 18 teams in 2013 and 16 teams from 2001–03 and 2006–12. The World League featured 8 teams in its inaugural year in 1990, 10 in 1991 and then 12 from 1992–2000 and 2004–05.
During the Intercontinental Round, Pools A to E will play double home and away matches, for a total of 12 matches per team. Pool F & G will feature two stand-alone tournaments per pool involving the four teams in the pool.
The last ranked team of Group 1 after the Intercontinental Round could be relegated if the winners of the Group 2 Final Round can meet the promotion requirements set by the FIVB.

Pools composition
The pools were announced on 1 December 2013.

Squads

Pool standing procedure
 Match points
 Number of matches won
 Sets ratio
 Points ratio
 Result of the last match between the tied teams

Match won 3–0 or 3–1: 3 match points for the winner, 0 match points for the loser
Match won 3–2: 2 match points for the winner, 1 match point for the loser

Intercontinental round
All times are local.

Group 1
The Group 1 Final Round hosts Italy, the top two teams from Pool A and B and the winners of the Group 2 Final Round will qualify for the Group 1 Final Round. If Italy finishes as one of the top two teams in Pool A, Pool A will send its top three teams.

Pool A

|}

Week 1
Venue:  Arena Jaraguá, Jaraguá do Sul, Brazil

|}

Week 2
Venue:  Ginásio Chico Neto, Maringá, Brazil
Venue:  PalaTrieste, Trieste, Italy
Venue:  PalaOlimpia, Verona, Italy

|}

Week 3
Venue:  Ginásio do Ibirapuera, São Paulo, Brazil
Venue:  PalaFlorio, Bari, Italy
Venue:  Foro Italico Tennis Center Court, Rome, Italy

|}

Week 4
Venue:  Azadi Indoor Stadium, Tehran, Iran
Venue:  Spodek, Katowice, Poland
Venue:  Atlas Arena, Łódź, Poland

|}

Week 5
Venue:  Azadi Indoor Stadium, Tehran, Iran
Venue:  Kraków Arena, Kraków, Poland
Venue:  Łuczniczka, Bydgoszcz, Poland

|}

Week 6
Venue:  Azadi Indoor Stadium, Tehran, Iran

|}

Week 7
Venue:  Unipol Arena, Casalecchio di Reno, Italy
Venue:  Ergo Arena, Gdańsk, Poland
Venue:  Mediolanum Forum, Assago, Italy

|}

Pool B

|}

Week 1
Venue:  Palace of Culture and Sports, Varna, Bulgaria

|}

Week 2
Venue:  Čair Sports Center, Niš, Serbia

|}

Week 3
Venue:  Walter Pyramid, Long Beach, United States
Venue:  Arena Armeec, Sofia, Bulgaria

   

|}

Week 4
Venue:  UIC Pavilion, Chicago, United States
Venue:  Energetik Sports Complex, Surgut, Russia

|}

Week 5
Venue:  Energetik Sports Complex, Surgut, Russia
Venue:  Sears Centre, Hoffman Estates, United States

|}

Week 6
Venue:  Yantarny Sports Complex, Kaliningrad, Russia
Venue:  SPC Vojvodina, Novi Sad, Serbia
Venue:  Čair Sports Center, Niš, Serbia

|}

Week 7
Venue:  SPC Vojvodina, Novi Sad, Serbia
Venue:  Arena Armeec, Sofia, Bulgaria
Venue:  Pionir Hall, Belgrade, Serbia

|}

Group 2
The Group 2 Final Round hosts Australia and the winners of Pool C, D and E will qualify for the Group 2 Final Round. If Australia finishes first in Pool C, Pool C will send its top two teams.

Pool C

|}

Week 1
Venue:  Sportcampus Lange Munte, Kortrijk, Belgium
Venue:  Country Hall Ethias Liège, Liège, Belgium

|}

Week 2
Venue:  Stampede Corral, Calgary, Canada

|}

Week 3
Venue:  Country Hall Ethias Liège, Liège, Belgium
Venue:  AIS Arena, Canberra, Australia
Venue:  Lotto Arena, Antwerp, Belgium

|}

Week 4
Venue:  Doug Mitchell Thunderbird Sports Centre, University Endowment Lands, Greater Vancouver Regional District, Canada
Venue:  Tampere Ice Stadium, Tampere, Finland

|}

Week 5
Venue:  Lotto Arena, Antwerp, Belgium
Venue:  Rexall Place, Edmonton, Canada
Venue:  Sportcampus Lange Munte, Kortrijk, Belgium

|}

Week 6
Venue:  Adelaide Arena, Adelaide, Australia
Venue:  Tampere Ice Stadium, Tampere, Finland

|}

Week 7
Venue:  Tampere Ice Stadium, Tampere, Finland
Venue:  Sydney Olympic Park Sports Centre, Sydney, Australia

|}

Pool D

|}

Week 1
Venue:  Brose Arena, Bamberg, Germany
Venue:  Polideportivo Municipal Gustavo Torito Rodríguez, San Martín, Argentina

|}

Week 2
Venue:  Park&Suites Arena, Montpellier, France
Venue:  Polideportivo Delmi, Salta, Argentina

|}

Week 3
Venue:  Microestadio de Lomas de Zamora, Lomas de Zamora, Argentina
Venue:  Porsche-Arena, Stuttgart, Germany

|}

Week 4
Venue:  Kindarena, Rouen, France
Venue:  Park Arena Komaki, Komaki, Japan
Venue:  Palais des Sports André Brouat, Toulouse, France

|}

Week 5
Venue:  Max-Schmeling-Halle, Berlin, Germany
Venue:  Shimadzu Arena, Kyoto, Japan

|}

Week 6
Venue:  Vendéspace, Mouilleron-le-Captif, France
Venue:  Koshigaya City Gymnasium, Koshigaya, Japan
Venue:  Halle Georges Carpentier, Paris, France

|}

Pool E

 

|}

Week 2
Venue:  Eindhoven Sports Centre, Eindhoven, Netherlands
Venue:  Pavilhão Desportivo Municipal da Póvoa de Varzim, Póvoa de Varzim, Portugal

|}

Week 3
Venue:  Budvar Arena, České Budějovice, Czech Republic
Venue:  Topsportcentrum Almere, Almere, Netherlands

|}

Week 4
Venue:  SD Arena, Chomutov, Czech Republic
Venue:  Dongchun Gymnasium, Ulsan, South Korea

|}

Week 5
Venue:  Suwon Gymnasium, Suwon, South Korea
Venue:  Centro de Desportos e Congressos de Matosinhos, Matosinhos, Portugal

|}

Week 6
Venue:  Opava Sports Hall, Opava, Czech Republic
Venue:  Chungmu Gymnasium, Daejeon, South Korea

|}

Week 7
Venue:  Topsportcentrum Rotterdam, Rotterdam, Netherlands
Venue:  Pavilhão Desportivo Municipal da Póvoa de Varzim, Póvoa de Varzim, Portugal

|}

Group 3
The Group 3 Final Round hosts Turkey, the winners of Pool F and G and the best second team among Pool F and G will qualify for the Group 3 Final Round.

Pool F

|}

Week 3
Venue:  Palacio de los Deportes Juan Escutia, Mexico City, Mexico

|}

Week 4
Venue:  El Menzah Sports Palace, Tunis, Tunisia

|}

Pool G

|}

Week 3
Venue:  Coliseo Guillermo Angulo, Carolina, Puerto Rico

   

|}

Week 4
Venue:  Steel Aréna, Košice, Slovakia

|}

Final round

Group 3
Venue:  Cengiz Göllü Volleyball Hall, Bursa, Turkey
All times are Eastern European Summer Time (UTC+03:00).

Final four (Week 6)

Semifinals

|}

3rd place match

|}

Final

|}

Group 2
Venue:  Sydney Olympic Park Sports Centre, Sydney, Australia
All times are Australian Eastern Standard Time (UTC+10:00).

Final four (Week 8)

Semifinals

|}

3rd place match

|}

Final

|}

Group 1
Venue:  Nelson Mandela Forum, Florence, Italy
All times are Central European Summer Time (UTC+02:00).

Pool play (Week 9)

Pool H

|}

|}

Pool I

|}

|}

Final four (Week 9)

Semifinals

|}

3rd place match

|}

Final

|}

Final standing

Awards

Most Valuable Player	
  Taylor Sander
Best Setter
  Saeid Marouf
Best Outside Spikers	
  Taylor Sander
  Ricardo Lucarelli
	
Best Middle Blockers	
  David Lee
  Lucas Saatkamp
Best Opposite Spiker
  Wallace de Souza
Best Libero
  Salvatore Rossini

Prize money

Prize Money for the Final Standing
 Champions – $1,000,000
 Runners-up – $500,000
 3rd place – $300,000
 4th place – $150,000
 5th place – $75,000 (2 teams)

Prize Money for the Awards
 Most Valuable Player – $30,000
 Best Setter – $10,000
 Best Outside Spiker – $10,000 (2 players)
 Best Middle Blocker – $10,000 (2 players)
 Best Opposite Spiker – $10,000
 Best Libero – $10,000

References

External links
Official website
Final Standing
Awards
Statistics of Group 1 Final Round
Statistics of Group 1
Statistics of Group 2
Statistics of Group 3

2014
FIVB World League